Paula Prioteasa (born 1936) was a Romanian politician (Communist).

She served as Minister of the Food Industry in 1986.

References

1936 births
20th-century Romanian women politicians
20th-century Romanian politicians

Possibly living people
Romanian communists
Women government ministers of Romania